This is the list of the railway stations in Liguria owned by:
 Rete Ferroviaria Italiana (RFI), a branch of the Italian state company Ferrovie dello Stato;
 Azienda Mobilità e Trasporti (AMT).

RFI stations

AMT stations

See also

Railway stations in Italy
Ferrovie dello Stato
Rail transport in Italy
High-speed rail in Italy
Transport in Italy

References

External links

 
Liguria